Imer-e Mohammad Qoli Akhund (also Romanized as Īmer-e Moḩammad Qolī Ākhūnd) is a village in Fajr Rural District, in the Central District of Gonbad-e Qabus County, Golestan Province, Iran. At the 2006 census, its population was 948, in 179 families.

References 

Populated places in Gonbad-e Kavus County